Battle of Lexington may refer to:
Battle of Lexington in Massachusetts, a 1775 skirmish which opened the American Revolutionary War
First Battle of Lexington in Missouri, an 1861 battle of the American Civil War
Second Battle of Lexington in Missouri, an 1864 battle of the American Civil War
Battle of Lexington, Tennessee, an 1862 battle of the American Civil War